USS Constellation (FFG-62) will be the lead ship of the  of guided-missile frigates and the fifth ship in the United States Navy bearing this name. She is named in honor of the first USS Constellation, one of the original six frigates of the United States Navy, which was named for the constellation of stars on the flag of the United States. The ship will be sponsored by Melissa Braithwaite, the wife of Secretary of the Navy Kenneth Braithwaite.

Construction of Constellation began on August 31, 2022. The ship is expected to enter service in 2026.

References

Proposed ships of the United States Navy